Events in the year 1865 in Brazil.

Incumbents
Monarch – Pedro II.
Prime Minister – Francisco José Furtado (until 12 May), Marquis of Olinda (starting 12 May).

Events
 10 June - Battle of São Borja

Births

Deaths

References

 
1850s in Brazil
Years of the 19th century in Brazil
Brazil
Brazil